The Dafydd ap Gwilym Society is the Welsh society at the University of Oxford.

History 
The society was established in 1886, making it the oldest society in Oxford after the Union. It is known by its members as "Y Dafydd". In the 1990s, several of the society's magazine editions (Yr Aradr), feature articles on the creative work of its members, as well as some of its guest speakers.

Among its founding members were O. M. Edwards and John Morris-Jones. The society began accepting female members in the academic year 1966–1967.

Traditions 
The society is named after the poet Dafydd ap Gwilym, and it was the tradition for every meeting to begin with a reading of his work by the Chaplain, followed by discussion.

The Society had some formal rituals and prestigious-sounding positions, though they were intended to be ironic. Today the chairman keeps the title of Chaplain, and the prestigious job of Headquarters remains.

It is traditional for members and alumni of the society to meet annually at the National Eisteddfod.

Caplaniaid of Y Dafydd

Presidents 
Some former-Fellows of the University who have served, or now serve as honorary presidents of the society:
 Sir John Rhys (1886–1919)
 Goronwy Edwards, (1919–1948)
 Sir Idris Foster, (1948–1978)
 Sir Rees Davies
 Robert Evans
 Rosalind Temple
 David Willis

Alumni of the Society 
 O. M. Edwards – educationalist and writer
 Ifan ab Owen Edwards – founder of the Urdd
 Elin Roberts - founder of Better Nature Tempeh
 Gwynfor Evans – politician
  - lexicographer
 W. J. Gruffydd – scholar and politician
 Guto Harri – newsreader
 R. Tudur Jones – scholar
  – theologian
 Rhodri Morgan – politician
 John Morris-Jones – writer
 Huw Thomas (Welsh politician) – Leader of Cardiff Council
 D. J. Williams – writer and nationalist
 Gwilym Owen Williams – archbishop
 J. E. Meredith – writer and minister
 Ben Lake – Plaid Cymru MP for Ceredigion
 Delyth Jewell – Plaid Cymru Member of the Senedd for South Wales East region, 2019-
 Rhys ab Owen - Plaid Cymru Member of the Senedd for South Wales Central, 2021-

References

External links 
 https://www.oxfordsu.org/societies/cymdeithasydafydd/
 Merched Dafydd

Clubs and societies of the University of Oxford
Welsh culture
Welsh society